The 2012 NRL Under-20s season was the fifth season of the National Rugby League's Under-20s competition. Known commercially as the 2012 Toyota Cup due to sponsorship from Toyota, the competition was solely for under-20 players. The draw and structure of the competition mirrored that of the NRL's 2012 Telstra Premiership season.

Season summary

Ladder

Finals series

Player statistics

Leading try scorers

Most tries in a game

Leading point scorers

Most points in a game

Leading goal scorers

Most goals in a game

Leading field goal scorers

Club statistics

Biggest Wins

Winning Streaks

 QF = Qualifying Finals
 SF = Semi-finals
 PF = Preliminary Finals
 GF = Grand Final

Losing Streaks

 QF = Qualifying Finals
 SF = Semi-finals
 PF = Preliminary Finals
 GF = Grand Final

References

External links
Official website
Statistics & Match Reports